is a Japanese football player for Kagoshima United FC.

Playing primarily as a right winger he capped his debut season with a well-taken brace against Montedio Yamagata during Avispa's 6-0 away win in J1 League.

Club statistics
Updated to end of 2018 season.

References

External links
Profile at Tochigi SC

1992 births
Living people
Association football people from Kagoshima Prefecture
Japanese footballers
J1 League players
J2 League players
J3 League players
Avispa Fukuoka players
Iwate Grulla Morioka players
Tochigi SC players
Kagoshima United FC players
Association football midfielders